Grete Kunz (born 7 April 1908, date of death unknown) was an Austrian fencer. She competed in the women's individual foil event at the 1952 Summer Olympics.

References

1908 births
Year of death missing
Austrian female foil fencers
Olympic fencers of Austria
Fencers at the 1952 Summer Olympics